Juan Esteban Rodríguez Segura (24 April 1818 – 17 September 1901) was a lawyer, deputy, governor, and Chilean senator, the only son of the patriot Manuel Rodríguez Erdoíza and grandfather of the ex-president of Chile Juan Esteban Montero Rodríguez. Segura studied at the University of Chile and was admitted to the bar in 1853.

Birth 
With regards to his birth and the supposed marriage of his parents, Manuel Rodriguez and Francisca Segura, it is indicated that they were married in 1817.

Childhood

Marriage and children 
In 1842 he was engaged to the widow Carmen Herrera Gallegos, a lady who had extensive lands near Pumanque.

Political career

Bibliography 
 Diccionario Histórico y Biográfico de Chile; Fernando Castillo Infante, Lía Cortés and Jordi Fuentes; Editorial Zig-Zag, Santiago, Chile, 1996, page 452.
 Biographical Summary from the Library of Congress of Chile.

External links 
 Basic Biography

1818 births
1901 deaths
People from Colchagua Province
Members of the Chamber of Deputies of Chile